Jari Heikki Myllykoski (born 27 June 1959 in Vaasa) is a Finnish politician currently serving in the Parliament of Finland for the Left Alliance at the Satakunta constituency.

References

1959 births
Living people
People from Vaasa
Left Alliance (Finland) politicians
Members of the Parliament of Finland (2011–15)
Members of the Parliament of Finland (2015–19)
Members of the Parliament of Finland (2019–23)